Drivenik Castle is a castle in the hinterland of Crikvenica and Novi Vinodolski, in the northern part of the Adriatic coast, western Croatia.

The castle of Drivenik is first mentioned in 1228 as one of the co-signers of the Vinodol Code. The castle sits in front of the mountain range called ‘Križišće’ opposite Tribaljsko polje (Tribalj field).

From the 13th century the castle was the seat of the district administration, and upon the arrival of the Frankopans, their deputy Dragoljub resided there in 1288.  In the 16th century (1571 based on an inscription on its walls) the castle was expanded in size and in the style of Renaissance fortresses it received round towers on its corners. Then in 1577, the castle was ruled by the noble family Zrinski.

The construction of the road in 1746 linked Drivenik to Novi Vinodolski and Bakar. This allowed the inhabitants to move from the hilltop down into the valley where present day Drivenik village developed along the roadway.  Ultimately the castle was abandoned as an active settlement, only the church of Sveti Dujam (St. Domnius) and its cemetery remained as active properties.

Near the castle is the chapel of St. Stephen, built probably at the end of the 16th century with its tower containing three bells.  The church has three building phases: Romanesque, Gothic and Baroque.  The church originally contained a late Gothic period 'Pieta' sculpture titled the "Mourning of Christ" and a Baroque period wood carved "Golden Altar".  Today both are in the Museum of Art and Crafts in Zagreb.

The chapel of St. Martin is situated at the cemetery. It has Baroque frescoes dating from the 18th century.  On its wall is a fresco "Taken down from the Cross".  There is the Way of the Cross with four shrines near the cemetery and at its end Calvary is marked with three high crosses dating from 1768.  The cemetery also contains a monument to fallen fighters from World War II.

The parish church of Sveti Dujam (St. Domnius) contains three naves and a bell-tower in the front.  Originally it was built with one nave, without the open bell-tower. Sveti Dujam's bell tower was built in 1806 and the entrance beneath the bell tower was constructed in 1846.

The sanctuary was decorated by Anton Cej in 1894 when the main marble altar was constructed.   The church floor contains burial vaults with the remains of a prominent local family Klarić (Gaspar 1653 and Marko 1753).  The church underwent partial restoration in 1968.

In the nearby town of Drivenik, a monument has been erected to the famous Croatian miniaturist J.J. Klović (Julio Clovio).

External links

Castles in Croatia